Club Sportiv Portul Constanța, commonly known as Portul Constanța, or simply as Portul, is a Romanian amateur football club based in Constanța, Constanța County, founded in 1930 and re-founded in 1949. The club is currently playing in the Liga IV.

Chronology of names

Honours
Liga III
Winners (4): 1946–47, 1966–67, 1990–91, 2004–05
Runners-up (6): 1964–65, 1975–76, 1980–81, 1981–82, 1999–00, 2000–01
Liga IV – Constanța County
Winners (1): 1998–99

Notable former players
The footballers mentioned below have played at least 1 season for Portul Constanța and also played in Liga I for another team.

  Iosif Bükössy
  Dumitru Caraman
  Mugurel Cornățeanu
  Constantin Koszka
  Ștefan Petcu

Notable Managers
  Vasile Luban
  Daniel Rădulescu
  Iosif Bükössy

References

Sport in Constanța
Association football clubs established in 1930
Football clubs in Constanța County
Liga II clubs
Liga III clubs
Liga IV clubs
1930 establishments in Romania